Gilda Ruta (13 October 1853 – 26 October 1932) was an Italian pianist, music educator  and composer.

Biography
Countess Gilda Ruta Cagnazzi was born in Naples, the daughter of composer Michele Ruta and English singer Emilia Sutton.

She studied music with her father and with the opera composer Saverio Mercadante and became a noted pianist. She played before Queen Margherita of Italy at the Constanzi Theater in Rome (now Teatro dell'Opera di Roma) and won a gold medal at the International Exposition in Florence. After being widowed at age of 27 with two children, she began composing. She moved to New York City, taught private piano lessons in Greenwich Village, and died of a cerebral hemorrhage in Manhattan at age 79.

Works
Ruta produced more than 125 works for piano and orchestra, and also composed for opera.

Selected works include:
Scherzo for pianoforte
Voglio guarire, melodia romantica
Tempo di Gavotta e Musette for pianoforte
Canto melanconico for contralto and basso
La Gavotta per pianoforte
Partirai!! canto for mezzo-sop and baritono
Alle stelle melodia romantica
Canzone marinaresca for soprano
Allegro appassionato for pianoforte
Per te! canto
Dolci memorie! melodia
Dammi un' ora d'amor! melodia romantica
The Fire-Worshippers opera
Cuore su Cuore valzer
Siciliana for pianoforte

References

Italian women classical composers
Italian classical pianists
Italian women pianists
Italian opera composers
1856 births
1932 deaths
Women opera composers
Italian classical composers
Italian emigrants to the United States
Italian people of English descent
19th-century classical pianists
20th-century classical pianists
19th-century classical composers
20th-century classical composers
19th-century Italian composers
20th-century Italian composers
19th-century Italian women
20th-century Italian women
Women classical pianists
20th-century women composers
19th-century women composers
19th-century women pianists
20th-century women pianists